John Weale (1791 – December 18, 1862 in Maida Vale) was an English publisher of popular scientific, architectural, engineering and educational works.

Life
He went into the trade first with George Priestley in St Giles, London who died around 1812, and worked then with Priestley's widow. He took a particular interest in the study of architecture. In 1823 he issued a bibliographical Catalogue of Works on Architecture and the Fine Arts, of which a new edition appeared in 1854. He bought the architectural publishing business at 59 High Holborn built up by Isaac Taylor and his son Josiah Taylor as The Architectural Library, after Josiah's death in 1834.

He followed the Catalogue in 1849–50 with a Rudimentary Dictionary of Terms used in Architecture, Building, and Engineering, a work which reached a fifth edition in 1876.

Weale died in London on 18 December 1862.

Works
Weale published also:

 Steam Navigation, Tredgold on the Steam Engine, Appendix A, edited and published by John Weale, London, 1839
 A Series of Examples in Architectural Engineering and Mechanical Drawing, London, 1841; supplemental Description, London, 1842.
 Designs of ornamental Gates, Lodges, Palisading, and Ironwork of the Royal Parks adjoining the Metropolis, edited by John Weale’ London, 1841.
 The Theory, Practice, and Architecture of Bridges of Stone, Iron, Timber, and Wire, edited by John Weale, London, 1843, 2 vols.; a supplemental volume, edited by George Rowdon Burnell and William Tierney Clark, appeared in 1853.
 Divers Works of early Masters in Christian Decoration, London, 1846, 2 vols.
 The Great Britain Atlantic Steam Ship, London, 1847.
 Letter to Lord John Russell on the defence of the Country, London, 1847.
 London exhibited in 1851, London, 1851; 2nd edit. 1852.
 Designs and Examples of Cottages, Villas, and Country Houses, London, 1857.
 Examples for Builders, Carpenters, and Joiners, London, 1857.
 Old English and French Ornaments, comprising 244 Designs. Collected by John Weale, London, 1858

He edited Weale's Quarterly Papers on Engineering, London, 1843–6, 6 vols., and Weale's Quarterly Papers on Architecture, London, 1843–5, 4 vols.

Weale's Rudimentary Series
Weale was on good terms with many men of science, and published cheap literature for technical education. His Rudimentary Series (over 130 works, usually selling at one shilling) and other educational series comprised standard works, both in classics and science. They were suggested initially by William Reid, and were continued after his death, first by James Sprent Virtue. The Rudimentary Series was later followed by the Weale's Scientific & Technical Series (1881-1923), published first by John Weale and then by Crosby, Lockwood and Son.

Source: Lists at end of the publications. The series was later taken on by the publisher Crosby Lockwood, who added volumes while retaining the system of reference numbers (across editions).

One of John Weale's earliest books published was Steam Navigation, Tredgold on the Steam Engine Appendix A which was edited and published under direction from Thomas Tredgold himself. Steam Navigation, Tredgold on the Steam Engine, Appendix A was printed by W. Hughes, King’s Head Court, Gough Square.

Its value in August 1839 was twelve shillings.

John George Swindell, Well-digging, Boring, and Pump-work
Edmund Beckett Denison, Clock and watch making
Joseph Glynn, On the construction of cranes, and machinery for raising heavy bodies
Joseph Glynn, On the power of water, as applied to drive flour mills, and to give motion to turbines and other hydrostatic engines
Alan Stevenson, On the history, construction, and illumination of lighthouses
William Snow Harris, On Galvanism
Thomas Roger Smith (1861) Acoustics

References

Notes

Attribution

External link

1791 births
1862 deaths
Burials at Kensal Green Cemetery
Publishers (people) from London
19th-century English businesspeople